Lee Wallace (born Leo Melis; July 15, 1930 – December 20, 2020) was an American actor of film, stage, and television.

Personal life
Wallace was born as Leo Melis in Brooklyn, New York, the son of Celia (née Gross) and Eddie Melis. As of 2016, Wallace lived in New York City with his wife Marilyn Chris until his death on December 20, 2020.  The couple have one child, Paul Wallace.

Career
His movie roles include more than a dozen productions big and small, including Klute (1971), The Hot Rock (1972), The Taking of Pelham One Two Three (1974) as the Mayor of New York City, The Happy Hooker (1975), Diary of the Dead (1976), Thieves (1977), Private Benjamin (1980) as Mr. Waxman, World War III (1982), Daniel (1983), Batman (1989) as Gotham City's Mayor Borg, and Used People (1992). John Simon in his review of Batman called Wallace "a perfect Ed Koch lookalike".

On Broadway, he appeared in A Teaspoon Every Four Hours, Unlikely Heroes, The Secret Affairs of Mildred Wild, Molly, Zalmen or The Madness of God, Some of My Best Friends, Grind and The Cemetery Club.

Filmography

References

External links

1930 births
2020 deaths
American male film actors
American male musical theatre actors
American male stage actors
American male television actors
Place of death missing
20th-century American male actors
21st-century American male actors
Male actors from New York City
People from Brooklyn
Burials at Kensico Cemetery